Norman Richard "Rocky" Farr (born April 7, 1947) is a Canadian former professional ice hockey goaltender. He played nineteen games in the National Hockey League with the Buffalo Sabres between 1973 and 1975, accumulating a record of 2-6-3. The rest of his career, which lasted from 1967 to 1976, was spent in various minor leagues.

Career statistics

Regular season and playoffs

External links
 
Rocky Farr @ hockeygoalies.org

1947 births
Living people
Buffalo Sabres players
Canadian ice hockey goaltenders
Cincinnati Swords players
Cleveland Barons (1937–1973) players
Denver Spurs (WHL) players
Fort Worth Wings players
Houston Apollos players
Johnstown Jets (NAHL) players
London Nationals players
Montreal Junior Canadiens players
Salt Lake Golden Eagles (WHL) players
Ice hockey people from Toronto
Springfield Indians players
Springfield Kings players